Hasanabad-e Govijeh (also Romanized as Ḩasanābād-e Govījeh; also known as Ḩasanābād and Ḩasanābād-e Amjadī) is a village in Agahan Rural District, Kolyai District, Sonqor County, Kermanshah Province, Iran. At the 2006 census, its population was 56, in 13 families.

References 

Populated places in Sonqor County